Jean Donnelly is an American poet.

Life
Jean Donnelly studied poetry at the creative writing program at George Mason University, where she co-founded the journal So To Speak: A Feminist Journal of Language & Art.

Her work appeared in Big Allis, Fence, The Germ, Lingo, Situation, and Volt.

She has co-curated the In Your Ear reading series at the District of Columbia Arts Center, and has taught poetry at Georgetown University.

She lives in Exeter, New Hampshire.

Awards
 2000 National Poetry Series, for Anthem

Works
 "from ANTHEM", Beltway Poetry Quarterly, Volume 3, Number 1, Winter 2002.
 "li", Limetree
 "Gg", Germ
 
  (chapbook)

Anthologies

Reviews
Jean Donnelly’s debut volume, Anthem, presents an unusually cohesive, finely conceived examination of contemporary American life from the perspective of an innovative, community-minded poet. The poet is also a mother — a fact most often relegated to bio-note relevance but which in this case is actually central to the poetry itself.

References

External links
 "Heather Fuller", DCPoetry

Year of birth missing (living people)
Living people
George Mason University alumni
Georgetown University faculty
American women poets
American women academics
21st-century American women